Dovey Coe is a children's historical novel by Frances O'Roark Dowell, published in 2000. Set in 1920s North Carolina, it is a first person narrative from the viewpoint of a mountain girl who wants to clear up confusion about a recent murder.

Plot
12-year-old Dovey Coe narrates the story trying to "lay the record straight" about her sister's suitor's death. The first two-thirds of the book recount the relationship between Dovey's sister, Caroline, and her suitor, Parnell. She offers her own viewpoint about each character including Dovey's parents and her brother, Amos, who is deaf. The last third of the novel is centered in the courtroom as the murder trial takes place.

Awards
 2001: Edgar Award, Best Children's 
 2003: William Allen White Children's Book Award

References

External links
 http://www.francesdowell.com/books/dovey-coe/

2000 American novels
2000 children's books
American children's novels
Children's historical novels
Children's mystery novels
Edgar Award-winning works
Novels set in the 1920s
Novels set in North Carolina